Scarborough Cricket Club may refer to

Scarborough Cricket Club (Australia), Western Australia
Scarborough Cricket Club (England), North Yorkshire